Acacia crassicarpa (northern wattle, thick-podded salwood, brown salwood, Papua New Guinea red wattle, red wattle; syn. Racosperma crassicarpum (A.Cunn. ex Benth.) Pedley.) is a tree native to Australia (Queensland), West Papua (Indonesia) and Papua New Guinea.

External links

Australian Government Department of the Environment and Water Resources: Acacia crassicarpa
2006 IUCN Red List of Threatened Species: Acacia crassicarpa
Acacia crassicarpa

crassicarpa
Fabales of Australia
Flora of Papua New Guinea
Flora of Western New Guinea
Vulnerable biota of Queensland
Vulnerable flora of Australia
Flora of Queensland